Diana Bong Siong Lin (born 5 September 1985) is a wushu taolu coach and retired athlete from Malaysia.

Career 
Bong's first major international victory was at the 2006 Asian Games where she won the bronze medal in women's nanquan. The following year, she was a gold medalist in nanquan at the 2007 Southeast Asian Games and a silver medalist in nanquan at the 2007 World Wushu Championships. She then won the bronze medal in women's nanquan at the 2008 Beijing Wushu Tournament. She then won another gold medal in nanquan at the 2009 Southeast Asian Games and a bronze medal in nangun at the 2009 World Wushu Championships.

In 2011, Bong won a bronze medal in nandao and nangun combined at the 2011 Southeast Asian Games and a silver medal in nanquan and a bronze medal in nangun at the 2011 World Wushu Championships. She then was a gold medalist in nandao and a double silver medalist in nanquan and nangun at the 2012 Asian Wushu Championships. The following year, she won a gold medal in nanquan and a bronze medal in nangun at the 2013 Southeast Asian Games. She also won a bronze medal in nanquan and nandao combined at the 2013 World Games. Then shortly after in the 2013 World Wushu Championships, she became the world champion in nandao and a silver medalist in nangun.

At the 2015 World Wushu Championships, Bong won a silver medal in nanquan. She then won two silver medals in nanquan and nangun at the 2016 Asian Wushu Championships. Her last competition was at the 2017 Southeast Asian Games where she was a gold medalist in nanquan. After her own competitive career. Bong became a wushu coach and judge.

See also

 List of Asian Games medalists in wushu

References

1985 births
Living people
Malaysian wushu practitioners
Place of birth missing (living people)
Competitors at the 2008 Beijing Wushu Tournament
Asian Games medalists in wushu
Wushu practitioners at the 2006 Asian Games
Wushu practitioners at the 2010 Asian Games
Wushu practitioners at the 2014 Asian Games
Asian Games bronze medalists for Malaysia
Medalists at the 2006 Asian Games
Competitors at the 2013 World Games
World Games bronze medalists
World Games medalists in wushu
Southeast Asian Games medalists in wushu
Southeast Asian Games gold medalists for Malaysia
Southeast Asian Games bronze medalists for Malaysia